Mauricio Horacio Reggiardo (born 22 February 1970 in Bragado) is a retired Argentine rugby union footballer. He played as a prop. He is currently the head coach of Pro D2 side Provence.

Reggiardo played for Pueyrredon Rugby Club of Mar del Plata and Club Atlético San Isidro in Argentina, before his move to Castres Olympique, in France, in 1996. He played the majority of his club career in Castres, from 1996/97 to 2004/05.

He had 50 caps for the Argentina national rugby union team, scoring 3 tries, 15 points on aggregate, including appearances at the 1999 and 2003 Rugby World Cups.

He retired in 2006 and turned his hand to coaching. He has coached at both his former clubs in France, Mazamet and Castres.

References

External links
 
 La 16 profile 

1970 births
Living people
Sportspeople from Buenos Aires Province
Argentine rugby union coaches
Argentine rugby union players
Club Atlético San Isidro rugby union players
Castres Olympique players
Rugby union props
Argentina international rugby union players